Going South is a 2009 French drama film directed by Sébastien Lifshitz and written by Lifshitz, Stéphane Bouquet and Vincent Poymiro. It stars Yannick Renier, Léa Seydoux, Nicole Garcia, Théo Frilet and Pierre Perrier. It was screened in the Panorama section at the Berlinale 2010.

Cast 
 Yannick Renier as Sam
 Léa Seydoux as Léa
 Nicole Garcia as The mother
 Théo Frilet as Mathieu
 Pierre Perrier as Jérémie
 Micheline Presle as The grandmother
 Gérard Watkins as The father
 Marie Matheron as The foster mother

References

External links 
 

2009 films
2000s coming-of-age drama films
2000s French-language films
French drama road movies
French coming-of-age drama films
2009 LGBT-related films
French LGBT-related films
LGBT-related drama films
2000s drama road movies
Films directed by Sébastien Lifshitz
Films scored by Jocelyn Pook
2009 drama films
2000s French films